Juan Espina y Capó (1848, Madrid - 15 December 1933, Madrid) was a Spanish painter and engraver, influenced by the Barbizon school, who specialized in landscapes.

Biography 
His father, Pedro Espina Martínez (1815-1883), was a doctor. His younger brother,  was also a doctor and his son, became a writer and politician.

At the age of only fifteen, he went to Paris. Upon his return, he enrolled at the "Escuela Especial de Pintura, Escultura y Grabado" of the Real Academia de Bellas Artes de San Fernando. There, he studied with the Belgian-born landscape painter, Carlos de Haes. 

After graduating, he travelled through North Africa and spent more time in Paris before returning home.

He was regular participant in the National Exhibition of Fine Arts; winning a third-class medal in 1881, and second-class medals in 1884 and 1895. In 1926, he won a first-class medal for his etchings. He was also a founding member of the "Asociación de Pintores y Escultores de Madrid", and served as their Secretary. In 1931, the Real Academia named him an Academician.

He also helped organized the first Salón de Otoño (Salon d'Automne) in Madrid and the Certamen de Arte Español in St. Petersburg (1900).

There is a cultural center in the Torrejón de Velasco district of Madrid that bears his name.

Sources 
 Javier Barón and José Luis Díez, El siglo XIX en el Prado, Museo Nacional del Prado, 2007 
 Several authors, Madrid 1898, March-April 1998, Ayuntamiento de Madrid,

External links 

 Biography and works @ the Museo del Prado
 Biographical notes @ the Frick Collection
 More works by Espina @ ArtNet

1848 births
1933 deaths
Spanish painters
Spanish landscape painters
Artists from Madrid
Spanish engravers